The Sinbad Show is an American television sitcom starring comedian David "Sinbad" Adkins that premiered on September 16, 1993, on Fox. The show's main plot is about a bachelor taking in two orphaned children. Chuck Brown performed this sitcom's theme music. It was cancelled on April 21, 1994, with two episodes left unaired.

Overview
The series follows the life of David Bryan (Sinbad), a carefree bachelor, who becomes a single parent when he adopts two orphaned children, Zana (Erin Davis) and L.J. Beckley (Willie Ray Norwood, Jr.), who face several issues which they work through together. 
  
The show follows David as he guides L.J. and Zana in their new lives, including counselling L.J. on dealing with school, friendships, girls, and being a teenager and helping Zana learn how to function in everyday life. Meanwhile, Clarence shares his antics and David's parents help him deal with raising kids.

Cast and characters

Main
 Sinbad as David Bryan: Dave is the father of the family. His friends often refer to him as "Red," and he is known for acting out flamboyant scenes for Zana and hitting on attractive women. He designs video games.
 Willie Ray Norwood, Jr. as L.J. Beckley: L.J. is the older brother of Zana. He is 12 years old but turns 13 in the duration of the show. He is one of the more sarcastic characters on the show. He often explains he can look after himself but wants Zana to be safe. He tries to control what Dave does for Zana. He doesn't do that well in school, and he gets tutored by Ms. Page. He is often very surly and disrespectful towards David and other authoritative figures.
 Erin Davis as Zana Beckley: Zana is 6 years old and has greatly depended on L.J. in the past. She loves David very much but is still insecure about moving away from him, due to her experiences with various foster homes.
 T. K. Carter as Clarence Hall: Clarence works at the Big and Tall store, and has been friends with David since grade school. He is often teased about his difficulties with women, although he remains boastful about his exploits. He is known for his cluelessness. He was the former roommate of David, but his lease was voided due to non-payment, allowing Sinbad to make room for the kids. Despite his eviction, Clarence gained a new lease in an adjoining residence and frequently visits David.

Recurring
Hal Williams as Rudy Bryan
Nancy Wilson as Louise Bryan

Guest stars
Patrice Chanel as Claudette (2 episodes)
Trina McGee as Faith (2 episodes)
Michael Ralph as Leon (2 episodes)
Peter Brost as Young Leon
Salma Hayek as Gloria Contreras (3 episodes)

Cancellation
The Sinbad Show was cancelled after its first season, and aired its last episode on April 21, 1994. It aired at 8:30 p.m., following The Simpsons, Thursday nights on Fox. The series was one of several shows featuring predominantly black casts that were cancelled by Fox around the same time (others included Roc, South Central and In Living Color). Activist Jesse Jackson protested the cancellations and called for a boycott of the network for their "institutional racism". Fox maintained that the series were low rated and the decision to cancel was not racially motivated.

Episodes

Syndication
The show aired in syndication on The Family Channel Monday to Thursday at 9:30 p.m. and weekend mornings at 11:30 a.m.. It also aired on Disney Channel for a short time during the mid-1990s.

Awards and nominations

References

External links

1990s American black sitcoms
1990s American sitcoms
1993 American television series debuts
1994 American television series endings
English-language television shows
Fox Broadcasting Company original programming
Television series by ABC Studios
Television shows set in San Francisco